The Dr. Kiran C. Patel Center for Global Solutions is a research center based at the University of South Florida in Tampa, Florida. The Patel Center's main goals are to identify challenges in the developing world and find viable solutions to those problems, particularly issues related to potable water and sanitation, urbanization and migration, and sustainable activities.

About the Patel Center
Founded in May 2005, the Patel Center for Global Solutions brings together faculty, staff, and students from the USF to facilitate the development of new research and technologies in pursuit of its Strategic Plan.  Although also a research institution, the Patel Center aims to transfer theory, advice, and technologies into on-the-ground realities.

The Founders
The Patel Center for Global Solutions was created through a charitable donation from Dr. Kiran C. Patel, a cardiologist based in Tampa, FL, and Dr. Pallavi Patel, a pediatrician also based in Tampa. The donation is among the largest ever to the University of South Florida. The Patels contributed US$5 million to provide for a new facility for the Patel Center.  The Patel donation was matched with US$5 million by the state of Florida. Two of Kiran Patel's healthcare companies have a history of defrauding the US government.

Executive Director
In January 2007, Betty Castor, former President of the University of South Florida, became the new executive director of the Patel Center for Global Solutions. In June 2009, Betty Castor resigned as executive director of the Patel Center. Dr. Donna Petersen was named the interim executive director in August 2009.

Patel Fellows
In November 2007, the Patel Center announced its group of inaugural Patel Fellows.  Each Patel Fellow, a member of the University of South Florida staff, receives a stipend of $15,000 to support research projects related to the Patel Center's work.

Patel Center facility
Plans are currently underway to build a Patel Center facility on the campus of the University of South Florida.

References

External links
 Patel Center for Global Solutions homepage
 University of South Florida homepage
 Africa Initiatives Group

University of South Florida
2005 establishments in Florida